Demetrida demarzi is a species of ground beetle in Lebiinae subfamily. It was described by Straneo in 1960 and is found in Australia.

References

Beetles described in 1960
Beetles of Australia
demarzi